Makenahalli is a village in the southern state of Karnataka, India. It is located in the Nelamangala taluk of Bangalore Rural district.

Demographics 
Makenahalli had population of 595 of which 315 are males while 280 are females as per report released by Census India 2011.

Geography 
The total geographical area of village is 458.76 hectares.

Bus Route from Bengaluru City 
Yeshwantapura - Darasahalli - Nelamangala

See also 

 Halenahalli
 Districts of Karnataka

References

External links 

Villages in Bangalore Rural district